Elmina Rainbow Bridge is the rainbow pedestrian bridge in the City of Elmina, Shah Alam, Selangor, Malaysia. It has two bridges along the Persiaran Dillena and is maintained by Sime Darby Property. In addition, the area is surrounded by greenery, and it has also become a picnic spot for picnic. In fact, the rainbow bridge is a sidewalk built on both sides of the road, embellishing the monotonous sidewalk, and playing a finishing touch.

Gallery

See also 
Saloma Link

References

Bridges completed in 2020
Pedestrian bridges in Malaysia